College Football Now is a television program that aired on NFL Network.   The program contained news and information about college football.

Brief show history
The show debuted on August 21, 2007 at 6:30 p.m. Eastern time with host Paul Burmeister and analysts Mike Mayock and Charles Davis.  NFLN debuted this program on a day in which College Football Live, a similar show on ESPN, was preempted due to coverage of the Little League World Series.
On September 4, NFLN moved the program to 6 p.m. ET, leading into the new talk show Put Up Your Dukes.
On August 19, 2008, the show returned after a hiatus.  It has been expanded to one hour; Put Up Your Dukes has been cancelled.

Personalities
 Paul Burmeister: Lead Host
 Fran Charles: Fill-in Host
 Charles Davis: Analyst
 Spero Dedes: Fill-in Host
 Terry Donahue: Analyst
 Mike Mayock: Analyst

Format
The program features interviews with players, coaches, and media members.  Many of the interviews with the media come from websites affiliated with Scout.com.  News on the recruiting process is also part of the show.

External links
Program page on NFL.com

NFL Network original programming
2010s American television series
2007 American television series debuts
College football studio shows